Scorton is a small village near the River Wyre, in the Wyre district of Lancashire, England. It is located north of Garstang. The name means "farmstead near a ditch or ravine."

Background
In the 19th century there was a cotton mill in the village and also a railway station on the West Coast Main Line which ran from 1841 until 1939. The village has three churches, a primary school, village hall, the Priory Hotel, Daisy Clough Nurseries and Wyresdale Park, and is home to The Barn garden centre, gift shop, cafe and restaurant. The annual Scorton Steam show takes place on Fathers' Day weekend in June each year  and the Lancashire Game and Country Festival which takes place at the same purpose-built showground.

The hills around include Nicky Nook, on the edge of the Forest of Bowland.

Buildings
St. Peters Church, built 1878–79, one of three churches  in the village, has a special family grave set up for the Farnworth and Metcalfe family, by James Metcalfe in the late 1950s.

Wyresdale Hall, built 1856–58, is one mile north-east and was built for the Ormrod family of Bolton.

Scorton Village Hall, built 1926, gifted by the Ormrod family to the people of the village.

Hall
Wyresdale Hall, a grade II listed country house and estate with licensed wedding barns, fishing lake and host to the Apple Store Cafe is located near the village.

People
 Thomas Hayton Mawson, landscape architect, was born here in 1861.
John Parkinson, designer of many of Los Angeles' iconic buildings, was born here in 1861.

Gallery

References

External links

Scorton Village
Scorton-Lancs.co.uk
Scorton Steam - annual event held in June of each year since 2005.
Lancashire Game and Country Festival

Villages in Lancashire
Geography of the Borough of Wyre
Forest of Bowland